Sir Charles Montague Lush (7 December 1853 – 22 June 1930) was a British barrister and judge.

Biography 
The son of the judge Sir Robert Lush, Lush was educated at Westminster School and at Trinity Hall, Cambridge, where he took a First in Classics in 1876. He was called to the bar by Gray's Inn in 1879, and joined the North Eastern Circuit. He took silk in 1902.

In 1910, Lush was appointed to the High Court and assigned to the King's Bench Division, receiving the customary knighthood on 13 October 1910. In 1915 he was appointed as President of the Railway and Canal Commission. He retired from the bench in 1925 due to deafness, and was made a Privy Counsellor the same year, although he never sat on the Judicial Committee of the Privy Council.

Although highly regarded as a barrister, he was not a successful judge: he was said to be too diffident and sometimes let personal feelings influence his decisions.

Arms

References 

1853 births
1930 deaths
Members of the Privy Council of the United Kingdom
Knights Bachelor
English King's Counsel
20th-century King's Counsel
People educated at Westminster School, London
Alumni of Trinity Hall, Cambridge
Queen's Bench Division judges